Frank Arthur Froehling III (May 19, 1942 – January 23, 2020) was an American tennis player.

During his college career at Trinity University Froehling recorded 46–5 in singles matches and won nine singles titles. He was also runner-up at U.S. National Tennis Championships in 1963 (where he beat Roy Emerson before losing to Rafael Osuna). That year Froehling was ranked world No. 6 by Lance Tingay of The Daily Telegraph. In 1971 Froehling reached the French Open semifinals (beating Arthur Ashe before losing to Ilie Năstase).

Grand Slam finals

Singles (1 runner–up)

Doubles (1 runner-up)

Mixed Doubles: (2 runner-ups)

References

External links
 
 
 
 

1942 births
2020 deaths
American male tennis players
Tennis players from San Diego
Trinity Tigers men's tennis players
Pan American Games medalists in tennis
Pan American Games bronze medalists for the United States
Tennis players at the 1963 Pan American Games
20th-century American people
21st-century American people
Medalists at the 1963 Pan American Games